Ulex (commonly known as gorse, furze, or whin) is a genus of flowering plants in the family Fabaceae. The genus comprises about 20 species of thorny evergreen shrubs in the subfamily Faboideae of the pea family Fabaceae. The species are native to parts of western Europe and northwest Africa, with the majority of species in Iberia.

Gorse is closely related to the brooms and like them has green stems and very small leaves and is adapted to dry growing conditions. The leaves of young plants are trifoliate, but in mature plants they are reduced to scales or small spines. All the species have yellow flowers, generally showy, some with a very long flowering season.

Species
The greatest diversity of Ulex species is found in the Iberian Peninsula, and most species have narrow distribution ranges. The most widely familiar species is common gorse (Ulex europaeus), the only species native to much of western Europe, where it grows in sunny sites, usually on dry, sandy soils. It is also the largest species, reaching  in height; this compares with typically  for western gorse (Ulex gallii). This latter species is characteristic of highly exposed Atlantic coastal heathland and montane habitats. In the eastern part of Great Britain dwarf furze (Ulex minor) replaces western gorse.

Common gorse flowers a little in late autumn and through the winter, coming into flower most strongly in spring. Western gorse and dwarf furze flower in late summer (August–September in Ireland and Great Britain). Between the different species, some gorse is almost always in flower, hence the old country saying: "When gorse is out of blossom, kissing's out of fashion". Gorse flowers have a distinctive coconut scent, experienced very strongly by some individuals but weakly by others.

Species list
The genus comprises the following species:

 Ulex argenteus Webb
 subsp. argenteus Webb
 subsp. subsericans (Cout.) Rothm. 

 Ulex australis  Clemente 
 subsp. australis
 subsp. welwitschianus (Planch.) Esp.Santo, Cubas, Lousã, C.Pardo & J.C.Costa
 Ulex baeticus Boiss.
 subsp. baeticus
 subsp. scaber (Kunze) Cubas

 Ulex borgiae Rivas Mart.

 Ulex canescens Lange
 Ulex cantabricus Alvarez & al.

 Ulex densus Webb
 Ulex erinaceus Welw. ex Webb
 Ulex eriocladus C.Vicioso

 Ulex europaeus L.—common gorse
 subsp. europaeus
 subsp. latebracteatus (Mariz) Rothm.

 Ulex gallii Planch.—western gorse or western furze

 Ulex jussiaei  Webb 

 Ulex micranthus Lange
 Ulex minor Roth—dwarf furze or dwarf gorse

 Ulex parviflorus Pourr.
 subsp. africanus (Webb) Greuter
 subsp. airensis (Esp.Santo, Cubas, Lousã, C.Pardo & J.C.Costa) Rivas Mart.
 subsp. parviflorus Pourr.
 subsp. rivasgodayanus Cubas

The number of species is likely higher, as many subspecies are not closely related to one another or have large differences in ploidy.

Species names with uncertain taxonomic status
The status of the following species is unresolved:

 Ulex eriophorus Gand.
 Ulex spicatus Gand.

Hybrids
The following hybrids have been described:
 Ulex ×breoganii (Castrov. & Valdés Berm.) Castrov. & Valdés Berm. (U. europaeus × U. gallii)
 Ulex ×dalilae Capelo, J.C.Costa & Lousã (U. densus × U. jussiaei)
 Ulex ×lagrezii Rouy (U. europaeus × U. minor)

Ecology
Gorse may grow as a fire-climax plant, well adapted to encourage and withstand fires, being highly flammable and having seed pods that are to a large extent opened by fire, thus allowing rapid regeneration after fire. The burnt stumps also readily sprout new growth from the roots. Where fire is excluded gorse soon tends to be shaded out by taller-growing trees unless other factors such as exposure also apply. Typical fire recurrence periods in gorse stands are 5–20 years.

Gorse thrives in poor growing areas and conditions including drought; it is sometimes found on very rocky soils, where many species cannot thrive. Moreover it is widely used for land reclamation (e.g. mine tailings), where its nitrogen-fixing capacity helps other plants establish better.

Gorse is a valuable plant for wildlife, providing dense thorny cover ideal for protecting bird nests. In Britain, France and Ireland it is particularly noted for supporting Dartford warblers (Sylvia undata) and European stonechats (Saxicola rubicola); the common name of the whinchat (Saxicola rubetra) attests to its close association with gorse. The flowers are sometimes eaten by the caterpillars of the double-striped pug moth (Gymnoscelis rufifasciata), whilst those of the case-bearer moth Coleophora albicosta feed exclusively on gorse. The dry wood of dead gorse stems provides food for the caterpillars of the concealer moth Batia lambdella.

Invasive species

In many areas of North America (notably California and Oregon), southern South America, Australia, New Zealand and Hawaii the common gorse, introduced as an ornamental plant or hedge, has become an invasive species owing to its aggressive seed dispersal; it has proved very difficult to eradicate and detrimental in native habitats. Common gorse is also an invasive species in the montane grasslands of Horton Plains National Park in Sri Lanka.

Management
Gorse readily becomes dominant in suitable conditions, and where this is undesirable for agricultural or ecological reasons control is required, either to remove gorse completely or to limit its extent.  Gorse stands are often managed by regular burning or flailing, allowing them to regrow from stumps or seed.  Denser areas of gorse may be bulldozed.

Uses

Foods
Gorse flowers are edible and can be used in salads and tea and to make a non-grape-based fruit wine.

As fodder gorse is high in protein it may be used as feed for livestock, particularly in winter when other greenstuff is not available.  Traditionally it was used as fodder for cattle, being made palatable either by bruising (crushing) with hand-held mallets or grinding to a moss-like consistency with hand- or water-driven mills or being finely chopped and mixed with straw chaff. Gorse is also eaten as forage by some livestock, such as feral ponies, which may eat little else in winter. Ponies may also eat the thinner stems of burnt gorse.

Fuel
Gorse bushes are highly flammable and in many areas bundles of gorse were used to fire traditional bread ovens.

In the island of Guernsey, Channel Islands, many traditional farms had furze brakes. The prolific gorse and bracken would be cut, dried and stored to be used as fuel, with farmhouses having purpose-built furze ovens.

Wood
Gorse wood has been used to make small objects; being non-toxic it is especially suited for cutlery. In spite of its durability it is not used for construction because the plant is too small and the wood is unstable, being prone to warping. Gorse is useful for garden ornaments because it is resistant to weather and rot.

Alternative medicine
Gorse has been listed as one of the 38 plants that are used to prepare Bach flower remedies, a kind of alternative medicine.

Gorse-based symbols
The furze is the badge of the Sinclair and MacLennan clans of Scotland. 
The flower, known as chorima in the Galician language, is the national flower of Galicia in northwest Spain.

The gorse is also the emblem of Brittany and is regaining popularity in Cornwall, particularly on St Piran's Day.

In popular culture
Its flammability rendered gorse symbolic as quickly flammable and quickly burning out; for example, Doyle, in his book Sir Nigel, has Sir John Chandos say: "... They flare up like a furzebush in the flames, but if for a short space you may abide the heat of it, then there is a chance that it may be cooler... If the Welsh be like the furze fire, then, pardieu! the Scotch are the peat, for they will smolder and you will never come to the end of them."

In many parts of Britain, especially Devon and Cornwall where it is particularly prevalent on the moors, the expression "kissing's out of fashion when the gorse is out of blossom" is a traditional jest as common gorse is thought to be always in bloom. Gorse, or rather furze as it was usually known in the West Country, sprigs were a traditional May Day gift between young lovers in the region, when in fact the blossom is at its peak.

References

External links
 
 
 'A Modern Herbal' (Grieves 1931)

 
Fabaceae genera
Edible plants
Flora of Africa
Flora of Europe
Flora of Spain
Invasive plant species in Sri Lanka
Medicinal plants
Nitrogen-fixing crops
Taxa named by Carl Linnaeus